The Lakhtinsky crossover is a railroad line that crosses the Lakhtinsky Razliv lake in Saint Petersburg, Russia. For the first stage of the Primorskaya line on the route from Novaya Derevnya to Lakhta, it was necessary to cross lake Lakhtinsky Razliv.

Construction
Engineer P. A. Avenarius  constructed the crossover in 1894. It was a  pile bridge which paralleled the Lakhtinsky dam on which there was a road. Near to the bridge, Shunting loop Dum and Shunting loop 2 verst were constructed. The bridge opened July 12, 1894.

Destruction and rebuilding
Catastrophic flooding on September 23, 1924 completely destroyed the bridge. It was restored in 1925 at its current location.

Current structure
As of 2009, the bridge is a metal one-span girder bridge, constructed from box-shaped beams on stone foundations.

References

Rail bridges in Saint Petersburg